Sir John Esplen, 1st Baronet, KBE (1863 – 7 February 1930) was an English shipbuilder.

Esplen was born in Liverpool, England, the son of William Esplen, a consulting engineer and naval architect. He was educated at Liverpool College and then joined the Liverpool engineering firm of Fawcett Preston, afterwards transferring to Earles' Shipbuilding Co of Hull. He then became a partner in his father's firm and helped to establish branches of the office in London, Cardiff, Buenos Aires, New York City and Montevideo. He finally became chairman of Esplen & Sons Ltd of Liverpool and Esplen, Son & Swainston Ltd of London, and was a director of many other shipbuilding and shipping companies.

During the First World War he served as director of oversea ship purchase at the Ministry of Shipping, and continued as chief professional adviser into the 1920s. For his work for the Ministry of Shipping he was appointed Knight Commander of the Order of the British Empire (KBE) in 1918 and in the June 1921 civil service honours, he was created a baronet of Hardres Court in the County of Kent, with the letters patent issued on 14 July 1921.

His name lives on in Esplen Avenue, Crosby.

Arms

Footnotes

References
Obituary, The Times, 8 February 1930

1863 births
1930 deaths
People educated at Liverpool College
English shipbuilders
British businesspeople in shipping
English engineers
Baronets in the Baronetage of the United Kingdom
Knights Commander of the Order of the British Empire
Civil servants in the Ministry of Shipping (United Kingdom)
Businesspeople from Liverpool